Janderson Santos de Souza (born 26 February 1999 in Barreiras), simply known as Janderson, is a Brazilian professional footballer who plays as a forward for Ceará.

Club career

Early career
Janderson was part of the  youth squad from 2016 until August 2018, when he was loaned to Corinthians. After good performances at the 2019 Copa São Paulo de Futebol Júnior, Corinthians reached a deal to sign him officially.

Corinthians
He made his professional debut in a 2019 Campeonato Brasileiro Série A home match against Chapecoense on May 1. Janderson went on to score his first goal on October 16 against Goiás.

Career statistics

Honours
Grêmio
Campeonato Gaúcho: 2022
Recopa Gaúcha: 2022

References

External links

1999 births
Living people
Sportspeople from Bahia
Brazilian footballers
Association football forwards
Campeonato Brasileiro Série A players
Campeonato Brasileiro Série B players
Campeonato Brasileiro Série C players
Joinville Esporte Clube players
Sport Club Corinthians Paulista players
Atlético Clube Goianiense players
Grêmio Foot-Ball Porto Alegrense players
Ceará Sporting Club players